Capturez un Marsupilami!, written and drawn by André Franquin, is a comic album containing the adventures and short gags of the Marsupilami. Although not collected in one album until 2002, the contents are the earliest works of the original artist, from publications in Risque Tout and Spirou magazine, and therefore given the number 0 in the series of Marsupilami albums.

Story
Le Marsupilami descend sur la ville (The Marsupilami Goes to the Village), 1955 
Noël d’un bagarreur (A Warrior's Christmas), 1956   
La bûche de noël (The Work of Christmas), 1957 
Touchez pas aux rouges-gorges (Don't Touch the Robins), 1956  
Les patins téléguidés (The Remote-controlled Rollerskates), 1957 
Le homard (The Lobster), 1957    
Tarzan (previously named Houu Bai), 1977 
La cage (The Cage), 1965 #1420 
Capturer un marsupilami (To Capture a Marsupilami), 1977-1981  

and 15 short gags from 1968 to 1972

Background
For the 50th anniversary of the character, Marsu Productions assembled this album, composed of the majority of Franquin's Marsupilami solo stories. Touchez pas aux rouges-gorges and La cage had been included in Spirou et Fantasio albums, but other stories were previously published in varied forms of Spirou context. This release also collects Franquin's two stories featuring the intrepid poacher Bring M. Backalive, and a story featuring the secondary Spirou et Fantasio character Le Petit Noël.

The album's title was given by the title of the final story, Capturer un Marsupilami, but the verb tense is changed from infinitive to imperative, "to capture" to "capture!".

This album was first published in Scandinavia in the 80s (titled as Å fange Spiralis in Norway, Jag Marsupilami in Sweden, and Spirillen in Denmark).

References

 Franquin publications in Spirou BDoubliées 

Footnotes

External links
Marsupilami official site albums 
Franquin site Marsupilami albums 

2002 graphic novels
Comics by André Franquin
Spirou et Fantasio albums
Works originally published in Spirou (magazine)
Marsupilami